William McEwan or William MacEwan may refer to:

 Sir William McEwan (1827–1913), Scottish brewer and politician
 William Barker McEwan (1870–1933), New Zealand librarian
 Bill McEwan, Canadian businessman
 Bill McEwan (rugby union), Scottish rugby player
 Willie McEwan (golfer) (1872–1931), Scottish golfer

See also
 Sir William Macewen (1848–1924), Scottish surgeon and neuroscientist